Nikole Sheri Hannah-Jones (born April 9, 1976) is an American investigative journalist, known for her coverage of civil rights in the United States. She joined The New York Times as a staff writer in April 2015, was awarded a MacArthur Fellowship in 2017, and won the Pulitzer Prize for Commentary in 2020 for her work on The 1619 Project. Hannah-Jones is the inaugural Knight Chair in Race and Journalism at the Howard University School of Communications, where she also founded the Center for Journalism and Democracy.

Early life
Hannah-Jones was born in Waterloo, Iowa, to father Milton Hannah, who is African-American, and mother Cheryl A. Novotny, who is white and of Czech and English descent. Hannah-Jones is the second of three girls. She was raised Catholic.

Hannah-Jones and her sister attended almost all-white schools as part of a voluntary program of desegregation busing. She attended Waterloo West High School, where she wrote for the high school newspaper and graduated in 1994.

After high school, Hannah-Jones attended the University of Notre Dame where she earned a Bachelor of Arts degree in history and African-American studies in 1998.

She graduated from the University of North Carolina Hussman School of Journalism and Media with a master's degree in 2003, where she was a Roy H. Park Fellow.

Career

In 2003, Hannah-Jones began her career covering education, which included the predominantly African American Durham Public Schools, for the Raleigh News & Observer, a position she held for three years.

In 2006, Hannah-Jones moved to Portland, Oregon, where she wrote for The Oregonian for six years. During this time her assignments included feature work, demographics, and then government and census beats.

In 2007, to commemorate the 40th anniversary of the 1965 Watts riots, Hannah-Jones wrote about the impact on the community of the National Advisory Commission on Civil Disorders, also known as the Kerner Commission.

From 2008 to 2009, Hannah-Jones received a fellowship from the Institute for Advanced Journalism Studies which enabled her to travel to Cuba to study universal healthcare and Cuba's educational system under Raul Castro.

In 2011, she joined the nonprofit news organization ProPublica, which is based in New York City, where she covered civil rights and continued research she started in Oregon on redlining and in-depth investigative reporting on the lack of enforcement of the Fair Housing Act for minorities. Hannah-Jones also spent time in Tuscaloosa, Alabama, where the decision in Brown v. Board of Education had little effect.

Hannah-Jones was elected as a member of the American Academy of Arts and Sciences in 2021.

In 2021, Hannah-Jones told CBS News that "All journalism is activism".

In January 2022, Hannah Jones and teacher Sheritta Stokes launched the 1619 Freedom School in Waterloo Iowa, inspired by the 1960s Freedom Schools of the civil-rights movement. The program is a five day a week, 2 hour literacy enrichment for the Waterloo school district for grade-school students.

The New York Times
In 2015, Hannah-Jones became a staff reporter for The New York Times.

Hannah-Jones has written about topics such as racial segregation, desegregation and resegregation in American schools and housing discrimination, and has spoken about these issues on national public radio broadcasts.

She writes to discover and expose the systemic and institutional racism that she says are perpetuated by official laws and acts.

Her work on racial inequalities has been particularly influential and is cited widely. Hannah-Jones reported on the school district where teenager Michael Brown had been shot, one of the "most segregated, impoverished districts in the entire state" of Missouri. Reviewer Laura Moser of Slate praised her report on school resegregation, which showed how educational inequality may have been a factor in the death of Brown.

Hannah-Jones was a 2017 Emerson Fellow at the New America Foundation, where she worked on a book on school segregation. The book, The Problem We All Live With, is due out in June 2020 from Chris Jackson's One World imprint at Random House.

Hannah-Jones is a 2017 recipient of the MacArthur Foundation fellowship. The award cited her "Chronicling the persistence of racial segregation in American society, particularly in education, and reshaping national conversations around education reform."

1619 Project

In 2019, Hannah-Jones launched a project to  fundamentally change the way slavery in the United States was viewed, timed for the 400th anniversary of the arrival of the first enslaved Africans in Virginia. Hannah-Jones produced a series of articles for a special issue of The New York Times Magazine titled The 1619 Project. The ongoing initiative began August 14, 2019, and "aims to reframe the country's history by placing the consequences of slavery and the contributions of black Americans at the very center of our national narrative." The project featured essays by a combination of staff writers and academics including Princeton historian Kevin M. Kruse, Harvard-trained lawyer Bryan Stevenson, Princeton sociologist Matthew Desmond, and SUNY historian Anne Bailey. In the opening essay, Hannah-Jones wrote "No aspect of the country that would be formed here has been untouched by the years of slavery that followed." The project also included poems, short fiction, and a photo essay. Originally conceived of as a special issue, it was soon turned into a full-fledged project, including a special broadsheet section in the newspaper, live events, and a multi-episode podcast series.

In 2020, Hannah-Jones won a Pulitzer Prize for Commentary for her work on the 1619 Project. The award cited her "sweeping, provocative and personal essay for the ground-breaking 1619 Project, which seeks to place the enslavement of Africans at the center of America's story, prompting public conversation about the nation's founding and evolution." Her paper was criticized by historians Gordon S. Wood and Leslie M. Harris, specifically for asserting that "one of the primary reasons the colonists decided to declare their independence from Britain was because they wanted to protect the institution of slavery." The article was "clarified" in March 2020 to read "for some of the colonists". There was also debate around whether the project suggested the nation was founded in 1619 with the arrival of enslaved Africans rather than in 1776 with the Declaration of Independence. Speaking to New York Times opinion writer Bret Stephens, Hannah-Jones said the suggestion of considering 1619 as a jumping-off point for interpreting US history had always been so self-evidently metaphorical that it went without saying.

New York University's Arthur L. Carter Journalism Institute named the 1619 Project as one of the 10 greatest works of journalism in the decade from 2010 to 2019. In 2022 the Hannah-Jones was nominated at the NAACP Image Award for Outstanding Literary Work – Nonfiction and was recognized with the Social Justice Impact Award.

University of North Carolina
In April 2021, the University of North Carolina announced Hannah-Jones would join the Hussman School of Journalism and Media in July 2021 as the Knight Chair in Race and Investigative Journalism. Following criticism, particularly from conservative groups who expressed disagreement with the 1619 Project and questioned Hannah-Jones's credentials, the University Board of Trustees, presented with the tenure committee's recommendation to approve her application for tenure, instead took no action. Unable to offer tenure without approval by its trustees, UNC announced they would instead offer a fixed five-year contract with an option for tenure review—terms to which Hannah-Jones agreed.

Outraged, more than 40 Hussman faculty members signed a statement criticizing the board's inaction, noting that the previous two Knight Chairs were given tenure and claiming that UNC "unfairly moves the goal posts" by not offering Hannah-Jones the same. The school's Black Caucus also condemned the terms of her contract, and students joined faculty in protests.  Hannah-Jones stated, "It's pretty clear that my tenure was not taken up because of political opposition, because of discriminatory views against my viewpoint and, I believe, [because of] my race and my gender." In late June 2021, Hannah-Jones, via a letter from her lawyers, said she will not take a faculty position with the university unless it is offered as a tenured position. On June 30, 2021, the Trustees for the University of North Carolina at Chapel Hill voted in a closed session to include tenure in the position offer.

Howard University
Hannah-Jones refused the position at North Carolina and decided to accept a tenured position at Howard University instead, where she will be the inaugural Knight Chair in Race and Journalism. Hannah-Jones said, "Once the news broke and I started to see the extent of the political interference, particularly the reporting on Walter Hussman, it became really clear to me that I just could not work at a school named after Walter Hussman. To be a person who has stood for what I stand for and have any integrity whatsoever, I just couldn't see how I could do that."

Ta-Nehisi Coates will join Hannah-Jones at Howard as the Sterling Brown Chair in the English Department. Jones also brings $20 million to Howard to support her work there, $5 million each from the Knight Foundation, the MacArthur Foundation, the Ford Foundation and an anonymous donor.

Controversies and criticism

Criticism of the 1619 Project

Five historians wrote to The New York Times Magazine to ask the creators of its 1619 Project to issue corrections, including for Hannah-Jones's assertions on the American Revolution and on Lincoln. The correction request was signed by Victoria Bynum of Texas State University, James M. McPherson and Sean Wilentz of Princeton University, James Oakes of the City University of New York, and Gordon S. Wood of Brown University. Historian Leslie M. Harris, who was consulted for the Project, wrote in Politico that she had warned that the idea that the American Revolution was fought to protect slavery was inaccurate, and that the Times made avoidable mistakes.

In the May 2022 issue of the libertarian magazine Reason, reporter Phillip W. Magness criticized the 1619 Project as "junk history." Magness contrasted the present work of Hannah-Jones with past work at historical understanding of slavery by prominent African-Americans such as Zora Neale Hurston. Magness stated:

Free Beacon reporter
A Washington Free Beacon reporter highlighted a tweet from Hannah-Jones from May 2016 in which she quoted someone using a racial slur. After being asked for comment, Hannah-Jones posted the reporter's inquiry, which contained his work phone number, on Twitter.  In an interview with Slate, Hannah-Jones said, "I didn't realize I was tweeting out his phone number, and when someone mentioned it, I should have deleted it. So absolutely. I did not intend to do that, and I wish that I hadn't."

Fireworks tweet
In June 2020, Jones apologized for retweeting a conspiracy theory claiming that fireworks were being set off by "government agents" to dampen the Black Lives Matter movement.

Middlesex School
In October 2021, the Middlesex School in Concord, Massachusetts rescinded a speaking invitation to Nikole Hannah-Jones for February 2022, claiming "the 'noise' associated with having Nikole as the speaker would take away from the overall experience."

Comments on Europe and Ukraine
In a February 2022 tweet, Hannah-Jones stated that Europe is "not a continent by definition" alleging that there is "a geopolitical fiction to separate it from Asia" (a reference to the fact that Eurasia, the largest continental landmass in the world, is geologically a single continent rather than two separate continents). She referred to the alarm over Russia's invasion of Ukraine and its people, who "appear white" as a racial "dog whistle". Several Twitter users rebuked and mocked Hannah-Jones for denying that Europe is a continent and for applying systemic racism to the invasion of Ukraine. Anthropologist Peter W. Wood called her comments "triumphant silliness" which came down to her desire "to find racism at the root of whatever happens". Shadi Hamid, a senior fellow at the Brookings Institution, said it was "absurd" for Hannah-Jones to claim that Europe isn't a continent and also called her comments about Ukraine "pretty insensitive considering Ukrainians are dying." She later clarified that "We should care about Ukraine," but not because "it is European, or the people appear white, or they are 'civilized' and not 'impoverished.'"

Ida B. Wells Society for Investigative Reporting

In early 2015, Nikole Hannah-Jones, along with Ron Nixon, Corey Johnson, and Topher Sanders, began dreaming of creating the Ida B. Wells Society for Investigative Reporting. This organization was launched in Memphis, Tennessee, in 2016, with the purpose of promoting investigative journalism, which is the least common type of reporting. Following in the footsteps of Ida B. Wells, this society encourages minority journalists to expose injustices perpetuated by the government and defend people who are susceptible to being taken advantage of. This organization was created with support from the Open Society Foundations, Ford Foundation, and CUNY Graduate School of Journalism.

Personal life
Hannah-Jones lives in the Bedford–Stuyvesant neighborhood of Brooklyn with her husband, Faraji Hannah-Jones (both shared their last names when they married November 1, 2003), and their daughter.

Awards
 2007, 2008, 2010: Society of Professional Journalists, Pacific Northwest, Excellence in Journalism Award
 2012: Gannett Foundation Innovation in Watchdog Journalism Award
 2013: Sidney Award
 2013: Columbia University, Paul Tobenkin Memorial Award
 2015: National Awards for Education Reporting, first prize, beat reporting
 2015: National Association of Black Journalists, Journalist of the Year
 2015: National Magazine Award finalist, public interest
 2015: Education Writers Association, Fred M. Hechinger Grand Prize for Distinguished Education Reporting
 2015: Emerson College President's Award for Civic Leadership
 2015: The Root 100
 2016: George Polk Award, radio reporting
2017: MacArthur Foundation Fellowship
2017: National Magazine Award winner, public interest
2019: University of North Carolina at Chapel Hill Distinguished Alumna Award
2020: 2020 Pulitzer Prize for Commentary
2021: Time magazine 100
2022:NAACP Image Award Social Justice Impact Award
2022: NAACP Image Award for Outstanding Literary Work – Nonfiction for "The 1619 Project: A New Origin Story"

Publications
 Hannah-Jones, Nikole. Fields of Lost Dreams: How Race and Racism Have Contributed to the Overrepresentation of Blacks in the Iowa Prison System. 2003. Print.
 Hannah-Jones, Nikole. Living Apart. ProPublica, 2012. Internet resource.
 Hannah-Jones, Nikole. Segregation Now: Investigating America's Racial Divide. 2014. Print.
 Hannah-Jones, Nikole, and Allyson Johnson. The Burden: African Americans and the Enduring Impact of Slavery. Minneapolis, Minn: Highbridge Audio, 2018. Internet resource.
 Hannah-Jones, Nikole, Mary Elliott, Jazmine Hughes, and Jake Silverstein. The 1619 Project: New York Times Magazine, August 18, 2019. 2019. Print.
 Hannah-Jones, Nikole. The 1619 Project: A New Origin Story. 2021. Print.
 Hannah-Jones, Nikole, Renée Watson, and Nikkolas Smith. The 1619 Project – Born on the Water. 2021. Print.

References

External links

 
 
 
 

1976 births
Living people
Journalists from Iowa
Writers from Waterloo, Iowa
African-American journalists
African-American women journalists
African-American writers
American investigative journalists
American magazine staff writers
American people of Czech descent
American people of English descent
American women journalists
Activists for African-American civil rights
School segregation in the United States
MacArthur Fellows
The New York Times writers
The News & Observer
The Oregonian people
Fellows of the American Academy of Arts and Sciences
UNC Hussman School of Journalism and Media alumni
University of Notre Dame alumni
20th-century African-American people
20th-century African-American women
21st-century African-American women
21st-century American journalists
21st-century American women writers